Abadula Gemeda (born 5 July 1958) is an Ethiopian politician who became the former Speaker of the House of Peoples' Representatives, the lower chamber of the Ethiopian Parliament, from 2010 to 2017. Previously, from 2005 to 2010, he was President of the Oromia Region. He was succeeded in that position by Alemayehu Atomsa.

Life
Abadula Gemeda was born Minase Woldegiorgis in Arsi Zone, Oromia Region, on 5 July 1958. The name Abadula Gemeda is a pseudonym or 'nom de guerre' he obtained at some point during his life. Abbaa Duulaa is the traditional title of the war leader of the Oromo people, an aristocratic horse name.

Abadula has a mix of military and civilian education. His military education was obtained from the Defense University of China in Military Leadership in 1995. His civilian education was focused on public administration. His Bachelor and Master's of Arts degrees from the US were both obtained from Century University in 2001 and 2004, respectively. Abadula also obtained his master's degree from Greenwich University, UK, in 2009.

Political career
With the change in government in 1991, Abadula became the chief of operations of the National Defense Force. After five years of service, he became the chief of intelligence in 1996. He was appointed as  commander of the ground force of the National Defense Force in 1998. He reached the rank of Major General. On October 16, 2001 he was appointed as Minister of National Defense. Moving to a civilian profile, Abadula became President of the Oromia Region in 2005.

Abadula is considered one of the few influential politicians within the OPDO. In 2010 he became Speaker of the House of Representatives. He resigned on 7 October 2017; the Addis Standard reported that it was in protest of Federal government's handling of clashes surrounding the boundary dispute between the Oromo and Somali regions. However he later withdrew his resignation after consultations in this government, remaining in office until April 2018 when he was replaced by Muferiat Kamil.

Immediately thereafter he was appointed National Security Advisor. His tenure was however short-lived; he was "honourably retired" in June 2018 less than two months after being named to the post.

References

1958 births
Living people
Presidents of Oromia Region
Speakers of the House of Peoples' Representatives (Ethiopia)
21st-century Ethiopian politicians
People from Oromia Region
Oromo Democratic Party politicians